Escadron de Transport 2/61 Franche-Comté is a French Air and Space Force squadron located at Orléans – Bricy Air Base, Loiret, France which operates the Lockheed C-130H Hercules, Lockheed Martin C-130J Super Hercules and the Lockheed Martin KC-130J.

See also

 List of French Air and Space Force aircraft squadrons

References

French Air and Space Force squadrons